The Israel Stevens House is a private home in Lawrence Township, Mercer County, New Jersey. It was added to the National Register of Historic Places in 2005.

See also
National Register of Historic Places listings in Mercer County, New Jersey

External links
NPGallery Digital Asset Management System

National Register of Historic Places in Mercer County, New Jersey
Houses in Mercer County, New Jersey
Lawrence Township, Mercer County, New Jersey
New Jersey Register of Historic Places